The 1894 New Hampshire gubernatorial election was held on November 6, 1894. Republican nominee Charles A. Busiel defeated Democratic nominee Henry O. Kent with 55.98% of the vote.

General election

Candidates
Major party candidates
Charles A. Busiel, Republican
Henry O. Kent, Democratic

Other candidates
Daniel C. Knowles, Prohibition
George D. Epps, People's

Results

References

1894
New Hampshire
Gubernatorial